Viking is an unincorporated community in St. Lucie County, Florida, United States.

The town was founded by a Norwegian immigrants Jens (1858-1944) and Agathe Helseth and was so named for a large community of Scandinavians. At one time, there was a school and a post office in addition to the Helseth pineapple farm. The Helseth estate was donated to the State of Florida.

Notes

Unincorporated communities in St. Lucie County, Florida
Unincorporated communities in Florida